Man Under Cover is a 1922 American crime film directed by Tod Browning and starring Herbert Rawlinson and George Hernandez. A copy of Man Under Cover is housed at the Museum of Modern Art.

Plot
As described in a film magazine, Paul Porter (Rawlinson) and his pal Daddy Moffat (Hernandez), who are two crooks, arrive at Paul's home town to find that Holt Langdon (Pring), a cashier at the bank and an old comrade of Paul's, is in trouble. Holt needs $25,000. Paul and Dad decide to "crack" the local bank that night and help Holt out. When the two enter the bank that night they discover the body of Holt, who has killed himself. They also find evidence showing that Holt was short $25,000 in his cashier's account. Because of Holt's friendship and because of his sister Margaret, who was Paul's boyhood sweetheart, they "frame" the bank to rearrange matters to make it appear to have been a hold-up where Holt died defending the bank's funds. The circumstances of the event impress Paul so deeply that he decides to leave his life of crime and to go straight. He saves Margaret from financial embarrassment by buying the little newspaper that she was running. Paul and Dad then discover that two confidence men are operating in the town and collecting thousands of dollars in a fake oil well scheme. They decide to outwit these crooks. With the aid of Colonel Culpepper (Marks), a lawyer, they start a fake well themselves and reproduce a typical gusher blowout. The two crooks, fooled into thinking that there is actually oil under the town's land, buy out their well at a high figure. Paul was thus able to return to the townspeople their savings mulcted by the foiled confidence men. Paul then tells Margaret the whole story. After learning of her brother's tragedy, she forgives Paul of his prior misdeeds. These two find happiness together.

Cast
 Herbert Rawlinson as Paul Porter
 George Hernandez as Daddy Moffat
 William Courtright as Mayor Harper (credited as William Courtwright)
 George Webb as Jones Wiley
 Edwin B. Tilton as 'Coal Oil' Chase (credited as Edwin Booth Tilton)
 Gerald Pring as Holt Langdon
 Barbara Bedford as Margaret Langdon
 Willis Marks as Colonel Culpepper
 Betty Eliason as Kiddie
 Betty Stone as Kiddie

Production
Louis Victor Eytinge wrote the screenplay for the film while serving a life sentence for murder in an Arizona prison.

References

External links

1922 films
1922 crime films
American crime films
American silent feature films
American black-and-white films
Films directed by Tod Browning
Universal Pictures films
1920s American films